Phillip TK Yin is a Journalist and a communications and corporate partnerships advisor.  He is currently an advisor and partner with the American Chamber of Commerce and speaks on U.S. networks including Fox Business on current events.  He was previously a broadcast business journalist covering topics such as business technology, aviation, and politics for CNBC, Bloomberg News and CCTV America. In business, Yin launched Charles Schwab's portfolio management business in Hong Kong and managed the Swiss-based Unifund. Following Lehman’s bankruptcy, Phillip helped lead and investigate credit derivatives mess which later led to the recovery of $1.8 billion on behalf of over 40,000 individual investors.

Early life and education

Yin was born in Mesa, Arizona, but moved to Yakima, Washington a few months later. Yin went to Eisenhower High School in Yakima, where he played tennis.

He holds an International MBA from Georgetown University and an undergraduate business degree from the University of Washington. He also completed a special summer program at Harvard Business School.

In 2015, Yin Phillip launched his Phil and Friends American Dream Foundation Scholarship Fund with the University of Washington, awarding scholarships to 10 students.

Political activity

In 2011, Yin considered running as a Republican and challenging sitting senator Maria Cantwell in the 2012 United States Senate election in Washington State. However, he exited the race due to fundraising concerns.

On January 22, 2016, Yin announced on Sina Weibo that he was running for Lieutenant Governor of Washington State. After losing that race he declared for the Bellevue City Council.

Personal life

Yin's parents Eric and Harriet are immigrants from Hong Kong, and he is a native of Washington state. His wife is from Hong Kong, and the two met and fell in love there. Yin has four children, daughters, Kelsey, Katie and Kelly and son, Kody.

References

External links
 Phillip TK Yin on Twitter
 CCTV Biz Asia America Broadcasts Featuring Phillip TK Yin on YouTube
 Media clips featuring Phillip TK Yin on Vimeo

American television journalists
Living people
American male journalists
Politicians from Yakima, Washington
McDonough School of Business alumni
Washington (state) Republicans
Year of birth missing (living people)